Aston-by-Stone  railway station is a disused railway station in the village of Aston, Staffordshire, England.

History
Opened by the North Staffordshire Railway, it became part of the London, Midland and Scottish Railway during the Grouping of 1923. The station closed in 1947

The site today
Trains still pass on the now electrified West Coast Main Line.

References

Further reading

External links 
  Aston station on navigable 1946 O. S. map

Disused railway stations in Staffordshire
Railway stations in Great Britain opened in 1901
Railway stations in Great Britain closed in 1947
Former North Staffordshire Railway stations